Majji (Telugu: మజ్జి) is one of the Indian surnames.

 Majji Sundarayya Patrudu was an Indian Communist politician. 
 Majji Tulasi Das was an Indian politician.
 Majji Narayana Das was an Indian politician.

See also 
 Maji (surname)
 Majhi (disambiguation)

Indian surnames